Alampla arcifraga is a moth in the family Immidae. It is found in New Guinea and Taiwan.

References

Moths described in 1914
Immidae
Moths of Asia